Bippus is an unincorporated community in Warren Township, Huntington County, Indiana, United States.

History
Bippus was laid out and platted in 1885, although a settlement had existed there for sometime prior. It was named for George Jacob Bippus, who was instrumental in bringing the railroad to the site.

Notable people
Bippus is the hometown of sportscaster Chris Schenkel.

References

Unincorporated communities in Huntington County, Indiana
Unincorporated communities in Indiana